Robert Bentley (11 March 1907 – 28 November 2000) was an American animator who worked for Warner Bros. Cartoons, Fleischer Studios, the Metro-Goldwyn-Mayer cartoon studio, Tex Avery, Walter Lantz Productions, UPA, Hanna-Barbera and Filmation among others.  He contributed to such animated productions as Star Trek: The Animated Series (1973–1974), Spider-Man (1967), and Max Fleischer's Gulliver's Travels (1939).

Filmography

1936
 Little Beau Porky

1937
 Porky's Road Race
 Porky's Romance (character animation – as Bob Bentley)
 Porky's Railroad (character animation)
 The Case of the Stuttering Pig (uncredited)
 The Woods Are Full of Cuckoos

1938
 Porky at the Crocadero (uncredited)
 Now That Summer is Gone (uncredited)
 Porky the Fireman
 Wholly Smoke (as Robt Bentley)

1939
 The Fresh Vegetable Mystery (uncredited)
 Gulliver's Travels

1940
 Fightin Pals

1942
 Under the Spreading Blacksmith Shop (artist)
 Good-Bye Mr. Moth (artist – uncredited)
 Nutty Pine Cabin
 Boogie Woogie Sioux

1943
 The Screwball (uncredited)
 Ration Bored (as Bob Bentley)

1946
 Bathing Buddies (layout – uncredited)

1947
 Uncle Tom's Cabaña
 Slap Happy Lion
 King-Size Canary

1948
 What Price Fleadom
 Little 'Tinker

1952
 Busybody Bear

1953
 Barney's Hungry Cousin
 Cobs and Robbers
 The Dog That Cried Wolf
 Little Johnny Jet
 The Mouse and the Lion
 Heir Bear
 T.V. of Tomorrow
 Wee-Willie Wildcat
 The Flying Turtle
 Maw and Paw
 Hypnotic Hick (artist)
 Half-Pint Palomino
 Hot Noon (or 12 O'Clock for Sure)
 Chilly Willy
 The Three Little Pups

1954
 A Horse's Tale
 Drag-a-Long Droopy
 The Impossible Possum
 Billy Boy
 Hay Rube
 Sleepy-Time Squirrel
 Homesteader Droopy
 Bird-Brain Bird Dog
 Paw's Night Out
 Pig in a Pickle
 The Farm of Tomorrow
 Real Gone Woody
 The Flea Circus

1955
 Helter Shelter
 Witch Crafty
 Private Eye Pooch
 Bedtime Bedlam
 Square Shootin' Square
 Bunco Busters

1956
 After the Ball
 Get Lost
 Chief Charlie Horse
 Woodpecker from Mars
 Niagara Fools
 Arts and Flowers

1957
 Red Riding Hoodlum
 Box Car Bandit
 The Unbearable Salesman
 International Woodpecker
 Round Trip to Mars
 Fodder and Son (see also Windy & Breezy)
 Dopey Dick the Pink Whale

1958
 Misguided Missile
 Salmon Yeggs
 His Better Elf
 Half Empty Saddles
 Everglade Raid
 Tree’s a Crowd
 Jittery Jester

1959
 Truant Student
 Tomcat Combat
 Log Jammed
 Bee Bopped
 The Tee Bird
 Romp in a Swamp
 Kiddie League

1960
 Inside Magoo (as Bob Bentley)
 Mister Magoo (TV Series) (as Bob Bentley)
 Pistol Packin' Woodpecker

1961
 Fee Fie Foes
 The Yogi Bear Show (TV Series)

1962
 The New Hanna-Barbera Cartoon Series

1963
 Beetle Bailey (TV Series) (as Bob Bentley)
 A Fallible Fable (layout)

1964-1965
 Linus the Lionhearted (TV Series) (as Bob Bentley)

1965
 A Charlie Brown Christmas (Graphic Blandishment)

1966
 The Marvel Super Heroes (TV Series) (as Bob Bentley)

1968
 The Archie Show (TV Series) (as Bob Bentley)
 The Batman/Superman Hour (TV Series) (as Bob Bentley)
 Fantastic Voyage (TV Series) (as Bob Bentley)

1969
 Here Comes the Grump (as Bob Bentley)
 Isle of Caprice (as Bob Bently)

1967-1970
 Spider-Man (TV Series) (as Bob Bentley in 21 episodes)

1970
 Mumbo Jumbo (as Bob Bentley)
 The Froze Nose Knows (as Bob Bentley)
 Doctor Dolittle (TV Series)
 A Dopey Hacienda (as Bob Bentley)
 Don't Hustle an Ant with Muscle (as Bob Bentley)

1973
 Treasure Island
 Lassie's Rescue Rangers (TV Series)
 Mission: Magic! (TV Series)
 My Favorite Martians (TV Series)

1973-1974
 Star Trek: The Animated Series

1974
 Oliver Twist

Sources

1907 births
2000 deaths
American animators
Warner Bros. Discovery people
Warner Bros. people
Warner Bros. Cartoons people
Hanna-Barbera people
Fleischer Studios people
Metro-Goldwyn-Mayer cartoon studio people
Walter Lantz Productions people